Sooriyamanal is a village in the Udayarpalayam taluk of Ariyalur district, Tamil Nadu, India.

Demographics 

As per the 2001 census, Sooriyamanal had a total population of 4386 with 2191 males and 2195 females.

References 

Villages in Ariyalur district